Matsari (मत्सरी) is a village of Durga Bhagwati rural municipality in Rautahat District in the Narayani Zone of south-eastern Nepal. It is one of the highly famous village of Maithil Brahmins (e.g. Jha, Mishra,Thakur) in Nepal.
The village takes its name from "matsa" which means fish. At the time of the 1991 Nepal census, there was a population of 3,157 people living in 564 individual households.  The literacy of this village is higher than any of the others in the country. The village is situated at the bank of Bagmati river. It lies around 8 kilometers north of the district headquarters Gaur. Most of the people of the village are employed in the "Government Service" of Nepal. "Durga-puja" of "Dashara" is very famous here, many people from various villages show up to observe the festival. 

Bhojpuri, Bajika, and Maithili are the languages spoken in the village.

References

Populated places in Rautahat District